Radioulnar articulation may refer to:

 Distal radioulnar articulation
 Proximal radioulnar articulation